The American Muslim Council (AMC) is an Islamic organization and registered charity in the United States. Its headquarters is located in Chicago, Illinois. 

An earlier organization with the same name was founded in 1990 by Abdul Rahman al-Amoudi with the support of the Muslim Brotherhood. (Al-Amoudi is also the former leader of the Islamic Society of Boston.) 

The AMC later reorganized itself under a new name and moved its national headquarters from Washington, D.C. to Chicago. The organization currently using the name "The American Muslim Council" is different from the AMC founded by al-Amoudi; it is much more moderate.

AMC took part in the defense of South Florida Professor and Palestinian Islamic Jihad leader Sami Al-Arian and questioned the US government's allegation that the professor took part in terrorist activities. AMC produced a pamphlet in which it said that "the FBI has a history of harassing and harming minority and immigrant communities".  On March 2, 2006, Al-Arian entered a guilty plea to a charge of conspiracy to help the Palestinian Islamic Jihad, a "specially designated terrorist" organization.  Al-Arian was sentenced to 57 months in prison, and ordered deported following his prison term.

AMC is also a member of the American Muslim Political Coordination Council (AMPCC), along with the American Muslim Alliance (AMA), Council on American-Islamic Relations (CAIR), and Muslim Public Affairs Council (MPAC).  AMPCC's primary concern is to coordinate the member organizations on activism and lobbying.

References

External links
American Muslim Council, official website
 

Islamic organizations based in the United States
Islamic political organizations
Muslim Brotherhood
Religious organizations based in Chicago